is a Japanese gravure idol, tarento, actress and one-time mixed martial arts fighter.

Sakuraba has appeared in several photobooks, films and TV series. She also participated in the MMA tournament ReMix World Cup 2000.

Biography

Background
Sakuraba was born  in Koriyama, Fukushima, Japan. She graduated from the Koriyama Women's University Associated Senior High School.

Modeling and acting career

Sakuraba debuted in 1996 with the photobook  published by gravure publisher Scola. She began to appear on TV programs and in gravure videos the same year.

She made her acting debut in 1997 in the V-Cinema film , directed by Minoru Kawasaki.

Sakuraba was romantically linked to Kenji Haga, her partner in the 1999 film Silver (directed by Takashi Miike) but it was later believed to be a publicity stunt.

In 1999, Sakuraba appeared in her first nude photobook titled Careyes and published by Roux Shuppan.

Her first theatrical film was Waru also directed by Takashi Miike.

Sakuraba has also participated in theatre.

Publications

Photobooks
, Scola, 
in the room, Scola, 
Careyes, Roux Shuppan, 
Ultimate Hunter: Guardless 4, Takeshobo,

Videos
, Scola, 
, Eichi Publishing, JAN 1902874032381, 
Careyes: Atsuko Sakuraba, SVC, JAN 1920876028009, 
Ultimate Hunter: Guardless 4 (VHS), Takeshobo, JAN 4985914111393, 
Ultimate Hunter: Guardless 4 (DVD), Takeshobo, JAN 4985914118057,

Filmography

V-Cinema
 (directed by Minoru Kawasaki)
Bad girls (directed by Minoru Akimoto and Yuzuru Ashiya)
F·I·S·H (directed by Kenji Seki)
Silver (directed by Takashi Miike)
 (directed by Takeshi Yokoi)
 (directed by Hiroyuki Tsuji)
 (directed by Hiroyuki Tsuji)
 (directed by Kanta Tagawa)
 (directed by Seiji Chiba and Kenji Tanigaki)
 (directed by Kanta Tagawa)
Two-F (directed by Kanta Tagawa)

Theatrical
Waru (directed by Takashi Miike)
 (directed by Shinpei Hayashiya)

TV programs
Tamori Club (TV Asahi)
 (Various)
 (Tokyo Broadcasting System)
 (Mondo21)

Theatre
 (directed by Uson Kimu, 2003)
 (directed by Uji Takinosuke, 2004)
 (directed by Uson Kimu, 2005)

Others
Serialization: , Weekly Manga Action,  -

Mixed martial arts career
She was clearly outmatched by the Russian, and despite her spirited efforts, her corner decided to throw the towel in after her arm was injured in an armbar from which Sakuraba did not want to tap, dislocating her elbow in the process.

Sakuraba also participated in ReMix Golden Gate 2001, although merely as a TV commentator.

Mixed martial arts record

|-
| Loss
|align=center| 0-1-0
|  Tatyana Kuvshinova
| TKO (corner stoppage)
| ReMix World Cup 2000
| 
|align=center| 1
|align=center| 2:26
| Tokyo, Japan
|

See also
List of Japanese gravure idols
List of Japanese actresses
List of female mixed martial artists

References

External links

Profile at Fightergirls.com
Profile at allcinema 
Profile at the Japanese Movie Database 
Profile at Kinema Junpo 
Profile at Oricon 
 
Official blog 

1976 births
Living people
People from Wakayama Prefecture
Japanese gravure idols
Japanese television personalities
Japanese female mixed martial artists